The 1964 Ohio Bobcats football team was an American football team that represented Ohio University in the Mid-American Conference (MAC) during the 1964 NCAA University Division football season. In their seventh season under head coach Bill Hess, the Bobcats compiled a 5–4–1 record (3–2–1 against MAC opponents), finished in fourth place in the MAC, and outscored all opponents by a combined total of 122 to 99.  They played their home games in Peden Stadium in Athens, Ohio.

The team's statistical leaders included Wash Lyons with 835 rushing yards, Larry Bainter with 443 passing yards, and Jim Dorna with 162 receiving yards.  Defensive tackle John Frick was a second-team All-America pick by the Associated Press (AP), and linebacker Skip Hoovler was an honorable mention All-America by the AP and United Press International.

Schedule

References

Ohio
Ohio Bobcats football seasons
Ohio Bobcats football